The Model Cities Program was an element of U.S. President Lyndon Johnson's Great Society and War on Poverty. The concept was presented by labor leader Walter Reuther to President Johnson in an off-the-record White House meeting on May 20, 1965. In 1966, new legislation led to the more than 150 five-year-long, Model Cities experiments to develop new antipoverty programs and alternative forms of municipal government. Model cities represented a new approach that emphasized social program as well as physical renewal, and sought to coordinate the actions of numerous government agencies in a multifaceted attack on the complex roots of urban poverty. The ambitious federal urban aid program succeeded in fostering a new generation of mostly black urban leaders. The program ended in 1974.

Program development
Authorized November 3, 1966, by the Demonstration Cities and Metropolitan Development Act of 1966, the program ended in 1974. Model Cities originated in response to several concerns of the mid-1960s. Widespread urban violence, disillusionment with existing urban renewal programmes, and bureaucratic difficulties in the first years of the War on Poverty led to calls for reform of federal programmes. The Model Cities initiative created a new program at the Department of Housing and Urban Development (HUD) intended to improve coordination of existing urban programs. Several cities including Detroit, Oakland, Newark and Camden received funding.  The program's initial goals emphasized comprehensive planning, involving not just rebuilding but also rehabilitation, social service delivery, and citizen participation. In 1969 the Nixon administration officially changed course; however in the majority of cities, citizen participation mechanisms continued to play an important role in local decision-making.

Other evaluations have identified both failures and success in the Model Cities program, with its limited effectiveness attributed to a combination of complicated bureaucracy, inadequate funding, and competing agendas at the local level.

Specific cities

Smithville, Tennessee, the smallest city to receive such funding, is an example of a city that benefited from the Model Cities Project. Congressman Joe L. Evins secured his hometown's inclusion in the project. Several buildings in downtown Smithville, such as the Dekalb County Court House and the Smithville City Hall, were built from funds from the Model Cities Project. They are still in use as of 2014 and make up a good portion of the downtown landscape.

Pikeville, Kentucky was the location of one of the biggest Model Cities projects. The project was completed in 1987 following 14 years of work at a cost of $77.6 million. The cut-through provides a path for a four-lane highway, a CSX railroad line, and the Levisa Fork of the Big Sandy River, which snaked through the downtown area, to eliminate almost yearly flooding. The river bed then was reclaimed by depositing fill from the cut-through into the old riverbed, significantly increasing the available space for development within the city.

McAlester, Oklahoma, represented by Speaker of the House Carl Albert, was another Model Cities site.   There, the program was instrumental in acquiring the land for a regional hospital, among other projects.

Detroit, Michigan was one of the largest Model Cities projects. Mayor Jerome P Cavanaugh (1962–69) was the only elected official to serve on Johnson's task force. Detroit received widespread acclaim for its leadership in the program, which used $490 million to try to turn a  section of the city (with 134,000 inhabitants) into a model city.

In Atlanta, there was a battle between competing visions. The city's political and business elite, and city planners, along with Atlanta's black middle class, wanted the federal funding to accelerate the economic growth of the entire city. They sought to protect the  central business district property values from nearby slums and to construct new revenue-generating structures. However local community activists rallied poor residents in opposition to these plans. They said federal renewal funding should be used to replace deteriorating housing stock, whether with new public housing or low-cost housing built by private developers.

References

Further reading
 Fine, Sidney. Violence in the Model City: The Cavanaugh Administration, Race Relations, and the Detroit Riot of 1967 (1989) 
 Frieden, Bernard J.,  and Marshall Kaplan, eds. The Politics of Neglect: Urban Aid from Model Cities to Revenue Sharing (MIT Press, 1975)
 Greenstone, J. David,  and Paul E. Peterson. Race and Authority in Urban Politics: Community Participation and the War on Poverty (University of Chicago Press, Russell Sage Foundation, 1976)
 Haar, Charles. Between the Idea and the Reality: A Study in the Origin, Fate and Legacy of the Model Cities Program (Boston: Little, Brown, 1975)
 Weber, Bret A., and Amanda Wallace, "Revealing the Empowerment Revolution: A Literature Review of the Model Cities Program," Journal of Urban History (2012) 38#1 pp. 173–92
 Sasso, John,  A Little Noticed Revolution: An Oral History of the Model Cities Program and Its Transition to the Community Development Block Grant Program (Berkeley Public Policy Press, 2005)   
 Schindler, Susanne, "Model Cities Redux," Urban Omnibus (October 2016). 
 Schindler, Susanne, "Model Conflicts," e-flux Architecture (July 2018).

Dissertations
 Larry Richard Davis, “An Appraisal of Selected Economic Development Projects of the Texarkana, Texas Model Cities Program” (PhD diss., University of Arkansas, 1975)
 Franklyn Lee Hruza, “Seattle Model Cities Program: A Case Study of Citizen Participation in the Planning Process During the Initial Planning Year, 1967–68” (PhD diss., University of Washington, 1972)
 Solomon G. Jacobson, “Implementation of a Federal Program at the Local Level: A Critique of the Introduction of the Model Cities Planning Program in Detroit” (PhD diss., University of Michigan, 1977)
 Martin David Lowenthal, “The Politics of Planning in the Model Cities Program” (PhD diss., University of California, Berkeley, 1970).
 Ricardo A. Millett, “Examination of ‘Widespread Citizen Participation’ in the Model Cities Program and the Demands of Ethnic Minorities for a Greater Decision Making Role in American Cities” (PhD diss., Brandeis University, 1973)
 Susanne Schindler, "The Housing that Model Cities Built: Context, Community, and Capital in New York City, 1966-76" (PhD diss., ETH Zurich, 2018).
 John Mitchell Sidor, Jr., “Comprehensive Planning in a Pluralist Environment: Model Cities Planning in Pittsburgh” (PhD diss., University of Pittsburgh, 1969)
 Charles Tantillo, “An Analysis of the Model Cities Program in Atlantic City, New Jersey” (PhD diss., Rutgers University, 1974)

Great Society programs
Urban planning in the United States